Gilten is a lake in the municipality of Steinkjer (with a small part crossing into neighboring Namsos) in Trøndelag county, Norway. The lake is only accessible by road from Namdalseid, even though most of the  lake lies in Steinkjer. The lake Bangsjøan lies to the northeast and the lake Snåsavatnet lies to the south.

See also
List of lakes in Norway

References

Steinkjer
Namsos
Lakes of Trøndelag